The 1992–93 New York Knicks season was the 47th season for the Knicks in the National Basketball Association (NBA). During the off-season, the Knicks acquired Charles D. Smith, Doc Rivers and Bo Kimble from the Los Angeles Clippers, acquired All-Star guard Rolando Blackman from the Dallas Mavericks, and Tony Campbell from the Minnesota Timberwolves, and later signed free agent Herb Williams in November. For the season, the Knicks changed their primary logo, adding a silver triangle behind a redesigned text of the word "Knicks" and an orange basketball. The team slightly redesigned their uniforms, replacing the previous Knicks logo with the newer logo on the right leg of their shorts. The Knicks' new logo remained in use until 1995, when they added the city name "New York" above their logo, while the uniforms lasted until 1997.

The Knicks got off to a 4–4 start to the season, but then won 12 of their next 15 games, held a 34–16 record at the All-Star break, and finished the season by winning 24 of their final 28 games, including a nine-game winning streak in March and five straight victories to end the season. The team had the most wins in the Eastern Conference during the regular season; their 60–22 record earned them the conference's top seed in the 1993 NBA Playoffs. They also posted a 37–4 home record at Madison Square Garden. Head coach Pat Riley was named Coach of the Year for the second time.

Patrick Ewing averaged 24.2 points, 12.1 rebounds and 2.0 blocks per game, and was named to the All-NBA Second Team, selected for the 1993 NBA All-Star Game, with Riley coaching the Eastern Conference, and finished in fourth place in Most Valuable Player voting. In addition, John Starks became the team's starting shooting guard, averaging 17.5 points and 5.1 assists per game, was named to the NBA All-Defensive Second Team, and finished in fourth place in Most Improved Player voting. Smith provided the team with 12.4 points per game, while sixth man Anthony Mason averaged 10.3 points and 7.9 rebounds per game off the bench, and finished tied in second place in Sixth Man of the Year voting, Blackman contributed 9.7 points per game, Rivers provided them with 7.8 points, 5.3 assists and 1.6 steals per game, and Charles Oakley averaged 6.9 points and 8.6 rebounds per game.

In the Eastern Conference First Round of the playoffs, the Knicks defeated the Indiana Pacers, three games to one, and advanced to the Eastern Conference Semi-finals. The Knicks won their series over the 5th-seeded Charlotte Hornets in five games and gained a spot in the Eastern Conference Finals, where they faced Michael Jordan, Scottie Pippen, and the two-time defending champion Chicago Bulls, who had eliminated the Knicks from the playoffs in three of the previous four years. After taking a 2–0 series lead, New York lost the next four games to the 2nd-seeded Bulls to end its season. The Bulls would go on to defeat the Phoenix Suns in six games in the NBA Finals, winning their third consecutive championship.

Following the season, Kimble was released to free agency after one season with the Knicks, having played only nine games as a reserve; Kimble had previously been selected by the Los Angeles Clippers with the eighth pick in the 1990 NBA draft, after a successful college career at Loyola Marymount.

NBA Draft

Roster

Regular season

Season standings

y – clinched division title
x – clinched playoff spot

z – clinched division title
y – clinched division title
x – clinched playoff spot

Record vs. opponents

Game log

Source:

Playoffs

|- align="center" bgcolor="#ccffcc"
| 1
| April 30
| Indiana
| W 107–104
| Patrick Ewing (25)
| Ewing, Oakley (9)
| Oakley, Starks (6)
| Madison Square Garden19,763
| 1–0
|- align="center" bgcolor="#ccffcc"
| 2
| May 2
| Indiana
| W 101–91
| John Starks (29)
| Charles Oakley (12)
| Doc Rivers (13)
| Madison Square Garden19,763
| 2–0
|- align="center" bgcolor="#ffcccc"
| 3
| May 4
| @ Indiana
| L 93–116
| Patrick Ewing (19)
| Patrick Ewing (13)
| Doc Rivers (7)
| Market Square Arena11,380
| 2–1
|- align="center" bgcolor="#ccffcc"
| 4
| May 6
| @ Indiana
| W 109–100 (OT)
| Patrick Ewing (28)
| Ewing, Oakley (13)
| Doc Rivers (11)
| Market Square Arena13,059
| 3–1
|-

|- align="center" bgcolor="#ccffcc"
| 1
| May 9
| Charlotte
| W 111–95
| Patrick Ewing (33)
| Ewing, Oakley (10)
| John Starks (12)
| Madison Square Garden19,763
| 1–0
|- align="center" bgcolor="#ccffcc"
| 2
| May 12
| Charlotte
| W 105–101 (OT)
| Patrick Ewing (34)
| Charles Oakley (16)
| Doc Rivers (7)
| Madison Square Garden19,763
| 2–0
|- align="center" bgcolor="#ffcccc"
| 3
| May 14
| @ Charlotte
| L 106–110 (2OT)
| Patrick Ewing (26)
| Patrick Ewing (14)
| John Starks (8)
| Charlotte Coliseum23,698
| 2–1
|- align="center" bgcolor="#ccffcc"
| 4
| May 16
| @ Charlotte
| W 94–92
| Patrick Ewing (28)
| Patrick Ewing (10)
| Doc Rivers (8)
| Charlotte Coliseum23,698
| 3–1
|- align="center" bgcolor="#ccffcc"
| 5
| May 18
| Charlotte
| W 105–101
| Charles Oakley (21)
| Charles Oakley (11)
| John Starks (9)
| Madison Square Garden19,763
| 4–1
|-

|- align="center" bgcolor="#ccffcc"
| 1
| May 23
| Chicago
| W 98–90
| Ewing, Starks (25)
| Patrick Ewing (17)
| Doc Rivers (5)
| Madison Square Garden19,763
| 1–0
|- align="center" bgcolor="#ccffcc"
| 2
| May 25
| Chicago
| W 96–91
| Patrick Ewing (26)
| Charles Oakley (16)
| John Starks (9)
| Madison Square Garden19,763
| 2–0
|- align="center" bgcolor="#ffcccc"
| 3
| May 29
| @ Chicago
| L 83–103
| Patrick Ewing (21)
| Patrick Ewing (9)
| Ewing, Anthony (5)
| Chicago Stadium18,676
| 2–1
|- align="center" bgcolor="#ffcccc"
| 4
| May 31
| @ Chicago
| L 95–105
| Ewing, Starks (24)
| Charles Oakley (12)
| John Starks (7)
| Chicago Stadium18,676
| 2–2
|- align="center" bgcolor="#ffcccc"
| 5
| June 2
| Chicago
| L 94–97
| Patrick Ewing (33)
| Patrick Ewing (9)
| John Starks (8)
| Madison Square Garden19,763
| 2–3
|- align="center" bgcolor="#ffcccc"
| 6
| June 4
| @ Chicago
| L 88–96
| Patrick Ewing (26)
| Patrick Ewing (13)
| Doc Rivers (8)
| Chicago Stadium18,676
| 2–4
|-

Player statistics

NOTE: Please write player statistics in alphabetical order by last name.

Season

Playoffs

Awards and records
Pat Riley, NBA Coach of the Year Award
Patrick Ewing, All-NBA Second Team
John Starks, NBA All-Defensive Second Team

Transactions

References

New York Knicks seasons
New York Knicks
New York Knicks
New York Knicks
1990s in Manhattan
Madison Square Garden